Reedy Creek Dam (or Kumbia Dam) is a relatively small dam that supplies the town water supply for Kumbia, Queensland.

References

1. https://maps.google.com.au/, 2015

Reservoirs in Queensland